Carl Douglass Upchurch (1950, Philadelphia – May 2, 2003, Bexley, Ohio) was an American activist, author and educator.  His commitment to education, civic and urban issues, and political justice earned him a national reputation.

He was portrayed by Omar Epps in the 2002 film Conviction.

Works
Convicted in the Womb, Bantam Books, 1996.

References

External links
 Official website
 
 

1950 births
2003 deaths
African-American activists
People from Bexley, Ohio
Activists from Ohio
21st-century African-American people